Parliamentary Affairs is a British peer-reviewed quarterly academic journal. Founded in 1947, it focuses on the government and politics of the United Kingdom, and also covers parliamentary systems across the world. It is published by the Oxford Journals section of Oxford University Press, in partnership with the Hansard Society, which was created to promote parliamentary democracy throughout the world. The journal is available online, and also produces podcasts. According to the Journal Citation Reports, the journal has an impact factor of 1.798 in 2018, ranking it 60th out of 176 journals in the category "Political Science". It is edited by Philip Cowley, Jon Tonge and David S. Moon.

References

External links
Parliamentary Affairs website
Hansard Society website

Political science journals
English-language journals
Publications established in 1947
Quarterly journals
Oxford University Press academic journals
1947 establishments in the United Kingdom